The Steregushchiy class, Russian designation Project 20380, is a class of corvettes being built for the Russian Navy. Designed by the Almaz Central Marine Design Bureau, subsequent vessels were built to an improved design (Project 20381), incorporating the Zaslon-Redut SAM system. The ship full displacement and dimensions are large for a corvette, thus it is designated as a frigate by NATO. The export variant is known as Project 20382 Tigr.

History
Such ships are used for littoral zone operations, engagement of enemy submarines and surface ships, and gun support of landing operations. The first batch built at the Severnaya Verf shipyard in St. Petersburg consists of four ships. A second building line has been started at Komsomolsk-on-Amur. The lead ship of this second batch was named .

The Russian Navy has publicly announced that they expect to buy at least 30 of these ships, for all four major fleets.

According to Jane's Naval Forces News, the first vessel was commissioned on 14 November 2007.

An additional order of eight corvettes of the project 20380 (and an additional two of the project 20385) was made in August 2020. Some of the ships may reportedly be built at the Amur Shipyard as destined for the Pacific Fleet, while others could be built at Severnaya Verf. As of November 2020, the allocation between shipyards for the ten new vessels had still to be decided. In December it was announced that the Amur Shipyard would build six new corvettes (two Project 20380 and four Project 20385) for the Pacific Fleet with projected service entry between 2024 and 2028. Construction was to begin in 2021.

Design
The Steregushchiy-class corvettes have a steel hull and composite material superstructure, with a bulbous bow and nine watertight subdivisions. They have a combined bridge and command centre, and space and weight provision for eight SS-N-25 missiles. Stealth technology was widely used during construction of the ships, as well as 21 patents and 14 new computer programs. Newest physical field reduction solutions were applied too. As a result, designers considerably reduced the ship's radar signature thanks to hull architecture and fire-resistant radar-absorbent fiberglass applied in tophamper's design.

The Kashtan CIWS on the first ship was replaced in subsequent vessels by twelve Redut VLS cells containing 9M96E medium-range SAMs of the S-400 system. SS-N-27 (Kalibr type missiles) will be fitted to a larger domestic version, Project 20385. For the anti-submarine warfare the ships are equipped with two 4-tube launchers of the Paket-NK ASW system.

The export version known as Project 20382 Tigr carries either eight supersonic SS-N-26 (P-800 Oniks) anti-ship missiles or sixteen subsonic SS-N-25 'Switchblade' (Kh-35E Uran). It also carries two twin-tube launchers for 533 mm heavy torpedoes instead of Paket-NK on the domestic version. The A-190E 100 mm gun first used in the s is controlled by a 5P-10E system that can track four targets simultaneously. Protection from air attacks is provided by the Kashtan CIWS and eight mounts for the SA-N-10 'Grouse' (9K38 Igla) SAM.

Export
In 2007 the Indonesian Navy made an agreement in principle (pending a full contract) for four vessels of this type to replace their ageing Dutch-built  corvettes. The first was to be built in Spain and fitted out in St. Petersburg, leaving open the option of Indonesian involvement in building the subsequent ships. This agreement appears to have lapsed; in 2011 Indonesia signed a deal for two Ada-class corvettes from Turkey. Rosoboronexport have briefed Singapore and the United Arab Emirates on the vessel.

The first actual contract for the export version, Project 20382 Tigr, was signed at the 5th International Maritime Defense Show in St. Petersburg in July 2011 when Algeria ordered two ships. The cost was estimated at US$120–150 million per ship. One was to be delivered to the Algerian Navy in 2014 and one in 2015, but over five years later, the IISS Military Balance 2020 did not list any such vessels in service with the Algerian Navy (IISS MB 2020, p. 341).

Operational history
Steregushchiy started sea trials in November 2006 and was commissioned in the Baltic Fleet on 14 November 2007.
Soobrazitelnyy, the second ship in the class, was launched on 31 March 2010 and was expected to start sea trials in November/December 2010. The ship was commissioned in October 2011.
Boikiy was commissioned in May 2013.
Stoikiy was commissioned in May 2014. Flag-raising ceremony was conducted on 27 July 2014.
Sovershennyy was launched in 2015 and joined the Pacific Fleet in late July 2017.
Gromkiy was commissioned in December 2018.
Hero of the Russian Federation Aldar Tsydenzhapov was commissioned in December 2020.
Mercury started final sea trials in December 2022.

2017 
On 14 October 2017, Soobrazitelny, Boikiy and tanker Kola embarked a deployment to the Mediterranean Sea and the Red Sea. The ships returned to their homeport on 14 January 2018 and were greeted by the commander of the Baltic Fleet Vice-Admiral Aleksandr Nosatov.

2020 

The first six corvettes participated in a large-scale exercise of the Russian Navy in March–April 2020. The exercise has been suggested to be an answer to the largest NATO post-Cold War simulation of amphibious landing in Europe Defender 2020.

The Russian exercise started with corvette Stoikiy and tank landing ship (LST) Korolyov being deployed to the North Sea in early March. In mid and late March, the three remaining corvettes saw deployments as well. Boikiy was active in the southern North Sea, together with LSTs Minsk and Kaliningrad, while Steregushchiy and Soobrazitelnyy were active in the central North Sea. Auxiliary ships present included the tug Nikolay Chiker, tankers Kola and Akademik Pashin, as well as special-purpose ship Yantar. Adding the Yaroslav Mudry's deployment to the Indian Ocean, this means that all active major surface combatants of the Baltic Fleet were active at the same time, which was an unprecedented event at the time and can be roughly compared only with the Ocean Shield 2019 exercise, where two LSTs, three corvettes and a frigate were active in the Baltic Sea. At the same time, however, frigates Admiral Grigorovich, Admiral Essen and Admiral Makarov of the Black Sea Fleet were also active. On 26 March, the combined Russian force with two Black Sea Fleet frigates, three corvettes and two LSTs of the Baltic Fleet was tracked by a nine-ship strong Royal Navy squadron.

At the Pacific Fleet, Sovershennyy and Gromkiy held an exercise along with cruiser Varyag, destroyers Bystryy, Admiral Tributs, Admiral Panteleyev, tracking ship Marshal Krylov and icebreakers Sadko, Ivan Susanin, as well as civilian icebreaker Kapitan Khlebnikov in the Sea of Japan. Another exercise was held in the Bering Sea by corvettes MPK-82, MPK-107, Ust-Ilimsk, Kholmsk, Moroz, Razliv, Iney, Smerch and two minesweepers.

The second stage of the exercise started on 8 April, when Steregushchiy, Soobrazitelnyy and Stoikiy were again deployed to the Baltic Sea. A day earlier, frigate Admiral Kasatonov, submarine Sankt Peterburg and tug Pamir of the Northern Fleet were reported to be in the Norwegian Sea on their way to the Baltic Sea as well.

The intense period of exercises continued in mid April. At the Pacific Fleet they involved one LST and six anti-ship corvettes. At the Northern Fleet they included two anti-ship, three anti-submarine corvettes and supposedly six nuclear submarines. The Baltic Fleet held three more exercises involving two LSTs, six anti-ship corvettes, two anti-submarine corvettes as well as other ships. Boikiy was deployed to the English Channel with tanker Akademik Pashin on 30 April.

In November–December 2020, corvettes Steregushchiy, Boikiy and tanker Kola took part in an unusually intensive Russian naval activity in the North Sea and areas near the United Kingdom. The deployments could have been an answer to the sailing of US, British and Norwegian warships to the Barents Sea for the first time after the Cold War earlier in 2020. Destroyer Severomorsk, accompanied by the tanker Sergey Osipov had been active in the area, as well and shortly afterwards destroyer Vice-Admiral Kulakov, accompanied by the tanker Akademik Pashin and intelligence ship Viktor Leonov. Vice-Admiral Kulakov, unusually, sailed west of the United Kingdom, in the area where the Russian Navy hasn't been known to be active since 2009 (in 2012 there was a friendly port call of Vice-Admiral Kulakov to Cork). Russian ships in the area included also submarine Staryy Oskol, tug Kapitan Guryev and patrol ship Vasily Bykov.

2021 
During the February–March exercises of the Baltic Fleet, Boikiy, Soobrazitelnyy and Steregushchy were active in the Baltic Sea, along with frigate Yaroslav Mudry, anti-ship corvettes Mytishchy, Sovetsk, Odintsovo, Zelenyy Dol, Serpukhov, Morshansk, Zarechnyy, Passat, anti-submarine corvettes Aleksin and Kabardino-Balkariya, LSTs Minsk and Korolyov, tanker Aleksandr Grebenshchikov, tug Anatoly Ptytsyn, research vessel Sibiryakov, minesweepers and other ships. The crews of the warships conducted artillery fires against targets simulating enemy warships and air attack weapons. On 18 February, conventional submarine Rostov-na-Donu and escort tug Nikolay Muru transited the area towards the Mediterranean Sea, as well. Finally, an amphibious landing exercise has been held with landing craft Michman Lermontov, Leytenant Rimskiy Korsakov, D-325, Mordoviya and others.

2022 

Jan 2022 The Russian Baltic Fleet's task force made up of corvettes  and  departed from the naval base of Baltiysk for a long-distance deployment As part of the long distance deployment the two corvettes carried out Naval excerises in the Atlantic outside of the Irish EEZ along with other ships and then visited Algeria. 

From 21 to 27 December 2022,  Project 20380 corvettes  ,  along with Russian destroyer Marshal Shaposhnikov and Pacific Fleet flagship Russian cruiser Varyag (1983) carried out joint drills in the East China Sea with the Chinese Navy.

Ships
Italics indicate estimates

See also
List of ships of the Soviet Navy
List of ships of Russia by project number
Gremyashchiy-class corvette
Project 20386 corvette

References

External links
Project 20380 Steregushchy Class Corvettes
Project 20380/20382/20385 Steregushchiy/Tigr class Corvette
Project 20380/20385 - Complete Ship List

 
Corvettes of the Russian Navy
Corvette classes